Shin Kuhn (12 February 1941 – 24 November 2015) was a Korean lawyer and politician who was the 25th director of the National Intelligence Service of South Korea.

References 

Members of the National Assembly (South Korea)
20th-century South Korean lawyers
Seoul National University School of Law alumni
People from Jeonju
1941 births
2015 deaths
Yeongsan Shin clan
Directors of the National Intelligence Service (South Korea)
People of the Agency for National Security Planning